Jesse Rothstein is an economist, and currently Professor of Public Policy & Economics at the University of California, Berkeley. In 2010, he was Chief Economist at the US Department of Labor.  He is the founding director of the California Policy Lab, a Research Associate of the National Bureau of Economic Research, and is a member of the editorial boards of Education Finance and Policy, Review of Economics and Statistics, American Economic Review, and Industrial Relations.

Selected works
 Rothstein, Jesse. "Teacher quality in educational production: Tracking, decay, and student achievement." The Quarterly Journal of Economics 125, no. 1 (2010): 175–214.
 Card, David, Alexandre Mas, and Jesse Rothstein. "Tipping and the Dynamics of Segregation." The Quarterly Journal of Economics 123, no. 1 (2008): 177–218.
 Card, David, and Jesse Rothstein. "Racial segregation and the black–white test score gap." Journal of Public Economics 91, no. 11-12 (2007): 2158–2184.
 Rothstein, Jesse. "Student sorting and bias in value-added estimation: Selection on observables and unobservables." Education finance and policy 4, no. 4 (2009): 537–571.
 Rothstein, Jesse M. "College performance predictions and the SAT." Journal of Econometrics 121, no. 1-2 (2004): 297–317.

References

Year of birth missing (living people)
Living people
American economists
Chief Economists of the United States Department of Labor
University of California, Berkeley faculty
Education economists
University of California, Berkeley alumni
Princeton University faculty
Harvard College alumni